Extreme Love: Autism is a 2012 British documentary film by Louis Theroux.

The documentary is the first part of Theroux's Extreme Love and is followed by Extreme Love: Dementia.

Theroux visits the DLC Warren school in New Jersey, one of the best schools in the United States for autism. There he meets the students and their families to get a glimpse of what life is like for them, and to experience the pleasures and the challenges faced by autistic children.

References

External links 
 
 

Louis Theroux's BBC Two specials
BBC television documentaries
2012 television specials
Documentary films about autism
Documentary films about special education
Special education in the United States
British television films
Television episodes set in New Jersey
BBC travel television series